Combat Zone is a location of military or other combat, but the term may also refer to:

 Combat Zone (Boston), the nickname for an adult entertainment district in downtown Boston, Massachusetts
 Combat Zone (TV series), a music video program on Canadian music television station MuchMusic
 Combat Zone, a documentary television series about combat on The Military Channel
 Combat Zone, a brand of airsoft guns by Umarex
 Combat Zone Wrestling, an American-based professional wrestling promotion

See also
Conflict Zone, a DW-TV program hosted by Tim Sebastian and Michel Friedman
War zone (disambiguation)